Saina may refer to:

 Betsy Saina (born 1988), Kenyan long-distance runner
 Saina Nehwal (born 1990), Indian badminton player
 Saina (film), a 2021 biographical film on Saina Nehwal
 Saipa Saina, a 2016–present Iranian subcompact sedan